HYDAC is a German company group that specializes in the production and distribution of components and systems as well as services related to hydraulics and fluidics. Hydac is constituted of 15 legal entities, all of which are GmbHs, companies with limited liabilities. CEOs for these companies are Alexander Dieter, Wolfgang Haering and Hartmut Herzog. Subsidiaries exist in more than 10 countries. In 2011, the company had approximately 5,500 employees.

History 
HYDAC was founded in 1963 by Werner Dieter and Ottmar Schön, when an exclusive license for central Europe for a hydraulic accumulator was taken out. The name HYDAC is an abbreviation for "hydraulic accumulator".

Company structuring 
In 2015, HYDAC had 9,000 employees, 50 subsidiaries, and 500 distribution and service partners. The company group is headquartered in Sulzbach (Saarland). More than 3000 employees are employed in Sulzbach.

In 2014, the subsidiary with the highest revenue was HYDAC Technology GmbH with revenues of €445.6 million and 384 employees. In the same year, HYDAC International GmbH and its 466 employees, which is presently providing distribution services to the other subsidiaries of the group, had revenues of €75.9 million.

The groups subsidiaries are:
 HYDAC Technology GmbH in Sulzbach / Saar
 HYDAC Filtertechnik GmbH in Sulzbach / Saar
 HYDAC Fluidtechnik GmbH in Sulzbach / Saar
 HYDAC International GmbH in Sulzbach / Saar
 HYDAC Verwaltung GmbH in Sulzbach / Saar
 HYDAC Electronic GmbH in Gersweiler / Saar
 HYDAC Accessories GmbH in Sulzbach / Saar
 HYDAC Process Technology GmbH in Neunkirchen / Saar
 HYDAC System GmbH in Sulzbach / Saar
 HYDAC Service GmbH in Sulzbach / Saar
 HYDAC PTK Produktionstechnik GmbH in Sulzbach / Saar
 HYDAC Cooling GmbH in Sulzbach / Saar
 HYDAC Filter Systems GmbH in Sulzbach / Saar
 HYDAC Grundstücksverwaltung GmbH in Sulzbach / Saar
 HYDAC FluidCareCenter GmbH in Sulzbach / Saar
 HYDAC Drive Center GmbH in Langenau
 HYDAC Speichertechnik GmbH in Sulzbach / Saar
 HYDROSAAR GmbH in Sulzbach / Saar
 Kraeft GmbH Systemtechnik in Bremerhaven
 NORDHYDRAULIC in Kramfors, Sweden
 QHP in Chester, England
 BIERI in Liebefeld, Switzerland
 HYCOM in Apeldoorn, Netherlands

References 

Hydraulic accumulators
Hydraulic engineering
German companies established in 1963
Companies based in Saarland
Corporate groups